Hossein Gholi Khan Ilkhani (1821-1882) was an Iranian nobleman of the Bakhtiari tribe and a powerful khan. Hossein Gholi Khan united the Bakhtiari tribe and killed many of his opponents in the process, eventually turning the Bakhtiari tribe, which had no role in politics, into one of the most powerful political poles of Qajar Iran. Most of Hossein Gholi Khan's children, including Ali-Gholi Khan Bakhtiari, played a role in important events in contemporary Iranian history, such as the Constitutional Revolution.

Towards the end of his life, Hossein Qoli Khan formed an alliance with Mass'oud Mirza Zell-e Soltan, the governor of Isfahan, and gained so much power that he intended to stage a coup against Nasser al-Din Shah. But Mirza Yusuf Ashtiani, then Prime Minister Nasser al-Din Shah, poisoned Hossein Qoli Khan with Qajar coffee.

Early life 
Hossein Gholi Khan Zarasvand Duraki, son of Jafar Gholi Khan Zarasvand Duraki and Bibi Shah Ipsand (daughter of Ali Saleh Al-Jamali) was born in 1821 in the Choghakhor region. His father, Jafar Qolikhan, was one of the two most powerful khans in the Bakhtiari tribe, who was killed by Jafar Qolikhan Behdarvand in 1836, when Hosain Qolikhan was 16 years old, in a dispute between the Bakhtiari tribes.

Therefore, he and his brothers; Imam Qoli Khan, Reza Qali Khan and Mustafa Qoli Khan spent their childhood and adolescence under the tutelage of their uncle, Kulb Ali Khan Duraki. But it was not long before there was a dispute between them and their uncle over the division of power and property.

War with Kulb Ali Khan 
Following the disputes, a rift broke out between them and Hussein Qoli Khan, along with a number of relatives and family, separated from his uncle. During the following years, several bloody wars broke out between Hussein Quli Khan and his brothers on the one hand and Kulb Ali Khan on the other.

In the first battles and the first wars, the victory belonged to Kulb Ali Khan, who had increased his fighting power after the alliance with Jafar Gholi Khan Behdarvand, but in the end it was the young Hussein Qali Khan who defeated his rivals.

Increasing the position in the Qajar court 
After defeating Kalbaali Khan, Hussein Qoli Khan's power began to unite the Bakhtiari tribes. Hussein Qoli Khan used the central government to suppress his rivals and took steps to advance the power structure by ousting rivals. He first defeated Mohammad Taghikhan Bakhtiari, who had refused to pay taxes to the central government for many years, in several battles, and then executed him. Then Musa Khan Babadi, the elderly Khan of the Babadi tribe under the title; Arrested insurgency and looting of state property. Suppression of insurgents and opponents of the central government, creating security and stability in the Bakhtiari region, participating in the Iran-Britain war; With the support of the Qajar government in 1857 and his other actions and services, he promoted his position in the Qajar court.

Death 
Prime Minister Mirza Yusuf Ashtiani was concerned about the military power and wealth of Husain qoli Khan and his involvement with Mass'oud Mirza Zell-e Soltan in the western and southern regions of the country. Therefore, on his orders, Hussein Qoli Khan was poisoned with Qajar coffee. Hossein Qoli Khan died of poisoning three days later, on June 14, 1882.

References 

Iranian people who died in prison custody
Deaths by poisoning
1821 births
1882 deaths
19th-century Iranian politicians
Bakhtiari people
People of Qajar Iran
19th-century Iranian military personnel